Marcus is an album by jazz bassist Marcus Miller.  It was released in 2008.

Marcus is the US version of the previously released album Free. This version not only has additional tracks, but different mixes of the tracks, a different cover and a modified track order.

Track listing
All songs written by Marcus Miller, except where noted.

 "Blast!"– 5:43
 "Funk Joint" – 5:12
 "Free" (Susaye Greene, Hank Redd, Nathan Watts, Deneice Williams) – 5:00
 "Higher Ground" (Stevie Wonder) – 5:10
 "Milky Way" (Miller, Kevin Moore) – 5:36
 "Pluck (Interlude)" – 3:19
 "Lost Without U" (Sean E. Hurley, Robin Thicke) – 4:41
 "'Cause I Want You" (Miller, Shihan van Clief) – 3:12
 "Ooh" (Miller, Lalah Hathaway) – 4:00
 "When I Fall In Love" (Edward Heyman, Victor Young) – 5:23
 "Strum" – 5:41
 "Jean-Pierre" (Miles Davis) – 6:15
 "What Is Hip?" (Emilio Castillo, David John Garibaldi, Stephen M. Kupka) – 6:02
 "Lost Without U (Spoken Word)" (Sean E. Hurley, Robin Thicke) – 5:34

Personnel
 Corinne Bailey Rae – vocals on "Free"
 Keb' Mo' – vocals on "Milky Way"
 Lalah Hathaway – vocals on "Ooh"
 Shihan the Poet – vocals on "'Cause I Want You"
 Taraji P. Henson – vocals on "Lost Without U (Spoken Word)"
 Gussie Miller – backing vocals
 David Sanborn – alto saxophone
 Tom Scott – tenor saxophone
 Michael "Patches" Stewart – trumpet, flügelhorn
 Paul Jackson, Jr. – guitar
 Bernard Wright – organ, synth
 Gregoire Maret – harmonica
 Poogie Bell – drums

Footnotes

Notes

References

2008 albums
Marcus Miller albums
Albums produced by Marcus Miller
Concord Records albums